Jacob Doyle Corman Jr. (September 17, 1932 – December 8, 2019) was a member of the Pennsylvania Senate.

Prior to his Senate service, Corman worked in the insurance and real estate business. He also served as Centre County Commissioner from 1968 through 1977. Corman was first elected to represent the 34th senatorial district in the Pennsylvania Senate in 1977, and retired in 1998. He was succeeded in the seat by his son, Jake Corman.

While in the Senate, he served as a member of the Republican State Committee of Pennsylvania.

The political website PoliticsPA described him as "The Godfather of the Centre County GOP." His family, to include his son, State Senator Jake Corman, are among the "most respected political families in Pennsylvania". Corman died on December 8, 2019.

References

External links

1932 births
2019 deaths
People from Centre County, Pennsylvania
Indiana University of Pennsylvania alumni
Republican Party Pennsylvania state senators
Political activists from Pennsylvania

Centre County Commissioners (Pennsylvania)